The Silver King is a lost 1919 American silent drama film directed by George Irving and starring stage star William Faversham. It is based on the play The Silver King by Henry Arthur Jones and Henry Herman.

Cast
William Faversham as Wilfred Denver
Barbara Castleton as Nellie Denver
Nadia Gray as Cissie Denver
Lawrence Johnson as Neddie Denver
John Sutherland as Jaikes
Warburton Gamble as Herbertr Skinner
Helen Meyers as Olive
John Sunderland as Geoffrey Ware
Daniel Pennell as Baxter
Cecil Yapp as Henry Corkett
William O'Day as Elijah Coombes
Louis Hendricks as Cripps
Robert Ayrton as Bilcher

References

External links

1919 films
American silent feature films
American films based on plays
Lost American films
Films directed by George Irving
Paramount Pictures films
American black-and-white films
Silent American drama films
1919 drama films
1919 lost films
Lost drama films
1910s American films